Banksia pseudoplumosa, commonly known as false plumed-banksia, is a species of shrub that is endemic to Western Australia. It has hairy stems, broadly linear, pinnatipartite leaves with sharply-pointed triangular lobes on the sides, yellow flowers in heads of about one hundred, and densely woolly-hairy follicles.

Description
Banksia pseudoplumosa is a shrub that typically grows to a height of  but does not form a lignotuber. There are between fifteen and thirty-one sharply-pointed triangular lobes on each side. Flowering occurs from November to December, and the follicles are oblong to egg-shaped and densely woolly-hairy.

Taxonomy and naming
This species was first formally described in 1996 by Alex George who gave it the name Dryandra pseudoplumosa and published the description in the journal Nuytsia from material collected by Margaret Pieroni near Salt River Road in the Stirling Range National Park. In 2007 Austin Mast and Kevin Thiele transferred all dryandras to the genus Banksia and renamed this species Banksia pseudoplumosa.

Distribution and habitat
False plumed-banksia grows in woodland over heath in the Stirling Range National Park and in patches of remnant vegetation north of Albany.

Conservation status
Banksia pseudoplumosa is classified as "endangered" under the Australian Government Environment Protection and Biodiversity Conservation Act 1999 and as "Threatened Flora (Declared Rare Flora — Extant)" by the Department of Environment and Conservation (Western Australia). The main threats to the species are dieback caused by Phytophthora cinnamomi and inappropriate fire regimes. An interim recovery plan has been prepared by the Government of Western Australia Department of Environment and Conservation.

References

pseudoplumosa
Plants described in 1996
Taxa named by Alex George